The 2017 Archery European Indoor Championships was the 16th edition of the European Indoor Archery Championships which was held in Vittel, France between 7–12 March 2017.

Medal table

Senior Results

Men

Women

Junior Results

References

External links
Official site
Results
Results Book

2017 in archery
2017 in French sport
European Archery Championships
International archery competitions hosted by France
March 2017 sports events in France